Market Square Center is a high-rise building in Indianapolis, Indiana, United States. It was completed in 1975 and has 20 floors. It is primarily used for office space. It is best known for its unique gold reflective glass facade and is popularly nicknamed the "Gold Building".

See also
List of tallest buildings in Indianapolis
List of tallest buildings in Indiana

External links

References

Skyscraper office buildings in Indianapolis

Office buildings completed in 1975
1975 establishments in Indiana